Nematherium is an extinct genus of ground sloth belonging to Mylodontoidea, it is either considered to be a member of Mylodontidae or Scelidotheriidae. It lived during the Middle Miocene epoch (Santacrucian). Fossils have been found in the Cura-Mallín Formation of Chile and the Santa Cruz and Sarmiento Formations of Argentina.

References 

Prehistoric sloths
Miocene xenarthrans
Miocene mammals of South America
Santacrucian
Neogene Argentina
Neogene Chile
Fossils of Argentina
Fossils of Chile
Fossil taxa described in 1887
Taxa named by Florentino Ameghino
Golfo San Jorge Basin
Sarmiento Formation
Austral or Magallanes Basin
Santa Cruz Formation